Elihu Hall Bay (November 10, 1838) was an associate justice of the precursor to the South Carolina Supreme Court. He was elected as an associate justice of the Court of General Sessions and Common Pleas on February 17, 1791. Bay began the tradition of recording court decisions in South Carolina in 1809.

Bay died on November 10, 1838. He is buried at St. Philip's Episcopal Church in Charleston, South Carolina.

References

1750s births
1838 deaths
Lawyers from Charleston, South Carolina
People from Havre de Grace, Maryland
Justices of the South Carolina Supreme Court
Burials in South Carolina
19th-century American lawyers